Dalene is a female given name. Notable people with the name include:

Dalene Kurtis (born 1977), Playboy model
Dalene Matthee (1938–2005), South African author
Dalene Stangl, American statistician
Dalene Young, screenwriter for 1980 teen comedy-drama film Little Darlings

Feminine given names